Brygidki is a prison in the building of a former Bridgettine nunnery in Lviv, Ukraine.

History
The monastery was founded in 1614 at the behest of Anna Fastkowska and Anna Poradowska for girls from noble families. After the Partition of Poland the Austrian administration decided to secularise the convent. In 1784 the Brygidki building was turned into a prison, where death sentences would be carried out on a regular basis until the 1980s.

Taken over by the Soviet Union after Soviet invasion of Poland in 1939, the prison was one of three sites of mass murder of political prisoners by NKVD in Ukraine in June 1941 as the Soviets were retreating before the Nazi German invasion. Approximately 7,000 prisoners - primarily Poles and Ukrainians - died in Lviv in that event.

During the German occupation, mass murders of Polish, Jewish and Ukrainian civilians occurred in Brygidki. It was the site of the murder of Prof. Kazimierz Bartel during the Massacre of Lwów professors.

The prison courtyard still contains a Baroque chapel from the former convent. There are plans to shut down the infamous prison or to move it out of the city.

Notable prisoners 
 Omelian Pleshkewycz (1919)
 Naftali Botwin (1925) - executed by Polish authorities
 Kazimierz Bartel (1941) - murdered by Nazi German authorities
 Mykola Radeĭko - a leader of the Ukrainian Insurgent Army

References

 

Buildings and structures in Lviv
Prisons in Ukraine
World War II sites in the Soviet Union
NKVD special camps
Prisons in the Soviet Union
Nunneries